La Lucerne Abbey (Abbaye Sainte-Trinité de La Lucerne) is a Premonstratensian monastery situated in the forests of the Thar valley in the Manche department, near the commune of La Lucerne-d'Outremer, in France.

History
The abbey was founded in 1143 by Hasculf de Subligny, son of Othoerne, the tutor of William Adelin, both of whom perished in the White Ship disaster of 1120, and later had the support of the English crown. The new monastery was settled from Dommartin Abbey near Hesdin. The foundation stone of the permanent buildings was laid in 1164 by Achard of St. Victor, who was later buried here. Construction lasted from 1164 to 1178 and was in the Romanesque style, in the restrained and sober manner of Cistercian architecture, except that the complex was dominated by an Anglo-Norman Gothic tower.

La Lucerne was the mother-house of four other Premonstratensian monasteries: Ardenne Abbey, Mondaye Abbey and Belle-Étoile Abbey (at Cerisy-Belle-Étoile) in Normandy, and Beauport Abbey in Brittany.

Major structural renovations were carried out in the 15th and 17th centuries.

During the French Revolution, in 1792, the abbey was suppressed. Its buildings were at first turned into a cotton mill and then used as a source of stone.

Reconstruction

The ruins were classed as a monument historique in 1928.

In 1959, under the aegis of Abbé Marcel Lelégard (1925-94), the enormous task was begun, which still continues under the "Fondation Abbaye de La Lucerne d'Outremer", of the restoration of the abbey. The first phase of the work was the reconstruction of the abbey church, particularly the ogival crossing vaults and the west front with its Romanesque portal, continuing to the refectory and cellars. 

Work has continued since then and the tithe barn, the Romanesque lavatorium (the only one in Normandy), the medieval gatehouse (with its bakery and courtrooms), the dovecote, the park, the 18th century abbot's lodgings and the ponds are all now restored. The chapel of Blessed Achard is in the process of restoration.

One of the aims of the "Fondation Abbaye de La Lucerne d'Outremer" has been to re-establish a monastic community at La Lucerne, and the abbey is still being rebuilt with that intention.

Gallery

Notes

Sources

 Website of the Abbaye de La Lucerne 

Premonstratensian monasteries in France
Christian monasteries established in the 12th century
Monuments historiques of Manche
Ruins in Normandy
Tourist attractions in Normandy